George Wilson Aiton (December 29, 1890 – August 16, 1976) was a Major League Baseball player. Aiton played for the St. Louis Browns in the 1912 season. He only played in ten games for the Browns, having four hits in seventeen at-bats. He played minor league baseball for the Clay Center Cubs of the Central Kansas League

Aiton was born in Kingman, Kansas and died in North Hollywood, California.

External links

St. Louis Browns players
1890 births
1976 deaths
Baseball players from Kansas
People from Kingman, Kansas
Clay Center Cubs players
Manhattan Elks players
Salina Insurgents players